Decalogue Stone may refer to:

Los Lunas Decalogue Stone, a large boulder on the side of Hidden Mountain, near Los Lunas, New Mexico, that bears a Hebrew inscription of unknown provenance
Newark Holy Stones, a set of artifacts, including a Decalogue and stone box, allegedly discovered within a cluster of ancient Indian burial mounds near Newark, Ohio.

See also

Decalogue (disambiguation)